Boston Tea Party is a Swedish infotainment television program is broadcast on Kanal 5 hosted by Filip Hammar and Fredrik Wikingsson.

Kanal 5 (Swedish TV channel) original programming